Shine is the eleventh studio album by Japanese singer Crystal Kay. It was released on December 16, 2015, through Delicious Deli Records, and marked her first album release in three years since Vivid (2012).

Background and release 
Shine is the eleventh studio album released by Crystal Kay. It is her first album released in three years since June 2012's Vivid, and her second album with Universal Music Japan. The album was released and distributed in three versions: a limited CD+Blu-ray edition, a limited CD+DVD edition, and a regular CD edition.

Singles 
"Kimi ga Ita Kara" (meaning "Because I Had You") is Kay's 30th physical single. The song was first released for digital download followed by two physical releases: a limited CD+DVD edition and a regular CD only edition. It was used as theme song for the Nippon TV drama Wild Heroes. The B-side track on the release "The Light" was previously released as her 11th digital single and was used as the commercial song for Samsung's Galaxy S6. This is Crystal's first physical single released in three years, following "Forever". The single reached #27 on the weekly Oricon Singles Chart and stayed in the ranking for six weeks, selling 6,146 copies.

"Revolution" is the 31st physical single released by Kay, featuring Japanese singer Namie Amuro. It premiered digitally in Japan on September 2, 2015, while the physical single was released to markets in Japan and Taiwan on September 16. The physical release was distributed in two versions: a limited CD+DVD edition and a regular CD only edition. Pre-orders for the single included a limited edition A2 sized poster. Commercially, the single peaked at #6 and sold more than 19,000 copies.

"Nando Demo" is the fourth digital single released by Kay. It was used as an insert song for the Fuji TV drama Otona Joshi.

Track listing

Charts and sales

Album

Singles

References 

Crystal Kay albums
2015 albums
J-pop albums